The Baldpate Inn is the historic name of a hotel located in Estes Park, Colorado, with designations on the National Register of Historic Places, and the Colorado State Register of Historic Properties. The property has changed hands several times, always under a private family's proprietorship. In 2020, the property was purchased and the name changed to the Seven Keys Lodge by the new owners.

History 
The hotel was founded in 1917 by Anglo-American brothers Charles Mace (combat and commercial photographer, 1889-1973), and Gordon Mace, and their families. The Inn is known especially two reasons: the hotel was named for the popular mystery novel, play and films Seven Keys to Baldpate by Earl Derr Biggers, and was eventually accepted to be the "true" Baldpate by the author.  While the hotel originally gave away keys as curios, today it is known for its collection of more than 20,000 keys, usual, unusual and figurative, that have been offered to the inn by visitors, hotel guests, and dignitaries from all over the world.  
Keys are cataloged in a database, supported by a grant from American History Savers and maintained by rotating curators who offer insight into the collections through a lecture series and blog. 

The hotel structurally survived the 2013 Colorado floods, although the road leading to the property, which also connects to local trailheads, was severely damaged due to erosion. They received support from the History Colorado State Historical Fund and Colorado Preservation.

References

External links

 Seven Keys Lodge
 The Baldpate Inn at Roadside America

Estes Park, Colorado
Hotels in Colorado
Hotels established in 1917
Buildings and structures in Larimer County, Colorado
National Register of Historic Places in Larimer County, Colorado
Seven Keys to Baldpate
Roosevelt National Forest